was a Japanese professional wrestling promotion managed by Nobuhiko Takada. Hustle can be described as an industry experiment to market the sports entertainment style of professional wrestling in Japan.

History
Booked primarily by Nobuhiko Takada and Yuji Shimada, the promotion’s basic premise pits the babyface, or good guy, Hustle faction whose goal is to “defend the industry”, against Generalissimo Takada’s heel, or bad guy, Monster Faction, whose mission is to destroy the sport. Unlike the traditional puroresu, the company emphasizes melodrama and caricatures over realism and athleticism. The group once maintained a close affiliation with mixed martial arts promoters PRIDE Fighting Championships when both were owned by Dream Stage Entertainment, or DSE.

Fans in the U.S. considered HUSTLE to be an answer to Takada's original wrestling style, the serious shoot style, having lost its popularity in Japan as a result of the UWFi vs. New Japan Pro-Wrestling feud and the rise of Pride and K-1.

As of 04/24/07, Hustle's ownership group (made up of former DSE employees) became "Hustle Entertainment" and former Kami no Puroresu editor Noboru Yamaguchi (who was part of the original Hustle brain trust) became President of the new organization. The group is still running their business at the old Dream Stage Entertainment offices, which became the PRIDE Worldwide Holding offices.

Earlier in 2007, Hustle ran a storyline where General Takada bought out Hustle for 1 billion Monster dollars and that everyone within the Hustle army became part of the Takada Monster Army. Some wrestlers received new gimmicks, like Naoya Ogawa turning into "Celeb" Ogawa, where he acted like a celebrity. The storyline was in response to DSE's bleak future due to financial troubles caused by yakuza scandals; DSE would eventually close doors after Pride Fighting Championships was officially bought out by Zuffa (the organization that owns UFC).

In July 2009, the leader of the Monster Army, Generalissimo Takada was "killed" when a new enemy by the name of "King RIKI" (played by actor/singer Riki Takeuchi) showed up at the "HUSTLE AID 2009" event and repelled one of Takada's lasers, sending it back towards him and wounding him. The following show the Monster Army was disbanded, as the direction of the company started to change.

In August 2009, President Noburo Yamaguchi stated that Hustle would be entering a new era. Straying away from the over the top storylines & gimmick-oriented "Fighting Opera" style that made them popular, to a more traditional wrestling "Professional Fighting" style.

Hustle president Nobuo Yamaguchi announced on October 28 that the promotion was folding. He made the announcement that they were out of money, and could no longer pay the staff and the wrestlers. He said that the scheduled 10/29 show at Korakuen Hall was canceled, as are all the rest of the shows on the schedule. Since Nobuhiko Takada left the promotion as the top heel, interest had gone way down. Many of the shows were before small crowds, and most of those crowds were papered.  While nobody would say so publicly, they were behind on paying a lot of the wrestlers, and the demise of the promotion has been expected for the last couple of months.  Yamaguchi said his goal was to eventually bring the promotion back. Wataru Sakata still runs Hustle shows under the banner "HUSTLE Man's World", with wrestler @UEXIL as the main eventer; however, they're only run sporadically and at the small venue Shin-Kiba FIRST Ring (approx. 250 capacity), without television exposure and attendance figures not posted.

In the beginning of 2010 some of Hustle's biggest names announced that they would be forming a new promotion, Smash, intended to replace the dead promotion. Smash held its first show on March 26, 2010. After a six-month hiatus, Hustle held two shows on April 30 and May 30, 2010. After another four-month break, the promotion held two more shows in October. In 2011, the Bleacher Report ranked Hustle No.13 on its list of the 25 worst professional wrestling promotions in history.

Final roster

Hustle Union Army
Magnum Tokyo (formerly "Detective" Alan Kuroki) - went into inactivity
Toshiaki Kawada - freelancer, inactive since 2010
"Karate Girl" KG - 
\(^o^)/ Chie (pronounced "Banzai Chie") - retired
Punch the C - freelancer
Akira Shoji (formerly Private Shoji) - jumped to Smash, returned to MMA in 2011

Riki Army
King Riki - inactive
Wataru Sakata - returned to Pro Wrestling Zero1
Genichiro Tenryu - formed Tenryu Project, retired in 2015
Yoji Anjo - inactive; retired in 2015 in a six-man match
Riki Choshu - inactive, retired in 2019
Yoshihiro Takayama - freelancer

Alumni
Deceased individuals are indicated with a dagger (†).
“Generalissimo” Takada (Nobuhiko Takada)
The Esperanza (Occasional)
"Hard Gay" HG
"Real Gay" RG
Bono-kun (Akebono) (formerly Monster Bono/Bono-Chan)
Monster C
Nise HG (Fake HG) (Keizo Matsuda)
Hiroshi Nagao (formerly "Giant Voba")- Retired in late 2008
"Hustle Buzzsaw" Tajiri
"Hustle Supernova" Kushida
Rey Ohara
Naoya Ogawa
Shinya Hashimoto †
"The Erotic Terrorist" Yinling
Abdullah the Butcher (Occasional)
Tiger Jeet Singh (Occasional)
Bob Sapp
Scott Norton
Bill Goldberg (one time)
Giant Silva
Rene Bonaparte
Tiger Jeet Singh Jr.
The Great Muta
Zeus (Osaka Pro)
A-chan (Nobutaka Araya)
Yoshie-chan (Yutaka Yoshie)
"Fire Monster" Shinjiro Otani
"Super Cyborg" Ryouji Sai
"Monster K'" Kohei Sato
Yosei (Wataru Sakata's Wife)
Keroro Gunsou
Erica (Aja Kong)
Dump Matsumoto
Minoru Suzuki
Warren Cromartie
Randleman
Coleman
Kurodaman
Mitsuyaman (Mitsuya Nagai)
Nosawa Rongai
Mazada
Masato Tanaka
Sodom & Gomora
Tadao Yasuda
Team 3D (Brother Ray and Brother Devon)
The Neo Devil Pierrots 1 & 2
Flying Vampire 16 & 23 & 25 & 28
Madama Devil (Devil Masami) (parody of Madama Butterfly and Dewi Sukarno)
Kaz Hayashi
Margaret (Amazing Kong)
"Hustle I" Taichi Ishikari
Hirotaka Yokoi
Arisin Z (Ayako Hamada)
Blanca X (Saki Maemura)
Caiya
Demon Spider
Jaguar Y (Jaguar Yokota)
Monster C (Steve Corino)
Monster J (Sonjay Dutt)
Seiichi Kusama
Kei Sasahara
Kyo Itako
Kidata-Low
Fujin & Raijin
Count Poisonous Cobra
Monster MAX (Maximum Capacity) †
Super Virus

Hustle Kamen
Hustle Kamen Blue
Hustle Kamen Green (Lil' Nate)
Hustle Kamen Red
Hustle Kamen Pink
Hustle Kamen Yellow
Hustle Kamen Orange
Hustle Kamen Silver
Hustle Kamen Gold

Championships

Hustle Hardcore Hero Championship 
The Hustle Hardcore Hero Championship (also referred to as the HHH Championship) was the top championship in the Japanese professional wrestling promotion Hustle. The title was more of a joke title since the Hustle promotion was never meant to be taken seriously. The title was represented by a giant gold and black spiked baseball bat.

Hustle Super Tag Team Championship 
The Hustle Super Tag Team Championship was the tag team championship in the Japanese professional wrestling promotion Hustle.

Events

See also

Professional wrestling in Japan

References

External links

Hustle Home page (japanese)
Hustle Entertainment news

Japanese professional wrestling promotions
2004 establishments in Japan
2009 disestablishments in Japan